Dance Parade is non-profit organization that promotes dance as an expressive and unifying art form by showcasing all forms of dance. It produces an annual street parade and festival in New York City each May, on the third Saturday before Memorial Day. Through its education programming it provides workshops and residencies to schools, community groups and senior centers.

Background
Greg Miller, a social entrepreneur and dance aficionado, established the non-profit organization in December, 2006 and led an all-volunteer group that produced the inaugural parade on May 19, 2007.  Over 2300 dancers from 75 organizations made their way down Manhattan’s Broadway and Fifth Avenue on and around eight floats. Ending in front of the Washington Square Memorial Arch, the parade culminated in 31 performances highlighting native New York dance styles such as hip-hop, jazz dance, break dancing, and salsa. Participants included the original B-boys, Keith and Kevin Smith; DJs Danny Tenaglia and Kool Herc; and Frieda Williams.

As defined by its Board of Directors (Mahayana Landowne, Trevor Hochman and Greg Miller), Dance parade’s mission is “to promote dance as an expressive and unifying art form by showcasing all forms of dance, educating the general public about the opportunities to experience dance, and celebrating diversity of dance in New York City by sponsoring a yearly city-wide dance parade and dance festival”.

In 2007, with Washington Square Park under renovation, the parade terminated in Tompkins Square Park. With the support of New York State Governor David Paterson and New York City Mayor Michael Bloomberg, the second annual Dance Parade drew 108 organizations representing 31 styles of dance, ten floats, and over 4,000 dancers. Jazz dancer Luigi was the Grand Marshal, accompanied by Miss Dance USA, the New York Knicks City Dancers, as well as ballerinas, salsaros, and club kids. Thirty-nine performances took place on stage in the park, and workshops gave the public the chance to learn dance.

The 2010 Dance Parade took place on Saturday May 22. The parade featured swing dancing, samba, tango, pole dancers and more.

Honorary Grand Marshals
Honorary Grand Marshals who have appeared at Dance Parade Garth Fagan, Kwikstep, Rokafella, Carmen de Lavallade, Robert Battle, Mary Verdi-Fletcher, Rekha Malhotra, Savion Glover, Jawolle Willa Jo Zollar, Hex Hector, Jacqulyn Buglisi, Baba Chuck Davis, Louie Vega, Ashley Tuttle, Elisa Monte, Bill Shannon, Trevor Hochman, Peter Zehren, Samir Bitar, Mel Alvarez, Jonathan Peters, Charles Reinhart, “Billy Elliot” (Joseph Harrington), Kat Wildish, Amy Marshall, Jellybean Benitez, Elizabeth Zimmer, Ellenore Scott, Don Campbell “Campbellock”, Morocco (Carolina Varga Dinicu), Luis Salgado, Luigi, Kool Herc, Danny Tenaglia, Djoniba Mouflet

References

 
 May 16, 2008 New York Times, Spare Times https://www.nytimes.com/2008/05/16/arts/16wspare.html?_r=2&8ur&emc=ur&oref=slogin&oref=slogin
 May 13, 2008 The Village Voice: Body-Moving as Defiance at the Dance Parade http://www.villagevoice.com/2008-05-13/music/dance-epidemic-tonight/
 March 11, 2008 The New Yorker http://www.newyorker.com/online/blogs/goingson/2008/03/wanna-be-starti.html
 March 11, 2008 About.com Article: The New York City Travel Guide http://gonyc.about.com/od/springinnewyorkcity/a/dance_parade.htm
 March 3, 2008 New York Magazine: "Best Small Time Parade" http://nymag.com/bestofny/kids/2008/smallparade/
 May 17, 2007 Time Out New York, “Dance Dance Revolution” by Elizabeth Bougerol http://www.timeout.com/newyork/articles/own-this-city/3270/dance-dance-revolution
 March 28, 2007 Fox5 News (WKNW) Story of Dance Parade http://www.myfoxny.com/myfox

External links

 
 

Dance in New York City
Parades in New York City